Ammonium hexachloroiridate(IV) is the inorganic compound with the formula (NH4)2[IrCl6]. This dark red solid is the ammonium salt of the iridium(IV) complex [IrCl6]2−.  It is a commercially important iridium compound one of the most common complexes of iridium(IV).  A related but ill-defined compound is iridium tetrachloride, which is often used interchangeably.

Structure and synthesis
The compound has been characterized by X-ray crystallography.  The salt crystallizes in a cubic motif like that of ammonium hexachloroplatinate.  The [IrCl6]2− centers adopt octahedral molecular geometry.

The compound is prepared in the laboratory by the addition of ammonium chloride to an aqueous solution of sodium hexachloroiridate.  The salt is poorly soluble, like most other ammonium hexachlorometallates.

Uses
It is a key intermediate in the isolation of iridium from ores. Most other metals form insoluble sulfides when aqueous solutions of their chlorides are treated with hydrogen sulfide, but [IrCl6]2− resists ligand substitution.  Upon heating under hydrogen, the solid salt converts to the metal:
 (NH4)2[IrCl6]  +  2 H2   →  Ir  +  6 HCl  +  2 NH3

Bonding
The electronic structure of ammonium hexachloroiridate(IV) has attracted much attention.  Its magnetic moment is less than that calculated for one electron.  This result is interpreted as the result of antiferromagnetic coupling between Ir centers mediated by Cl---Cl interactions.  Electron spin resonance,  studies reveal that more than half of the spin density resides on chloride, thus the description of the complex as Ir(IV) is an oversimplification.

References

Iridium compounds
Ammonium compounds
Chloro complexes
Chlorometallates